Santiago Ahuanojinou Zannou (born 1977) is a Spanish filmmaker.

Biography 
Zannou was born in 1977 in Madrid, son to a father from Benin and a mother from Aragon. He was raised in Carabanchel, leaving for Mallorca at age 19.

Zannou's debut film The One-Handed Trick (2008) earned him the Goya Award for Best New Director (the film also won Best New Actor and Best Original Song). It was followed by two documentary films, namely  (2009; a documentary about the Spain national football team) and La puerta de no retorno (2011; tracking the return of his father Alphonse Zannou to Benin with his family 40 years after leaving).

His second fiction feature Scorpion in Love (2013), penned alongside Carlos Bardem, earned him a nomination to the Goya Award for Best Adapted Screenplay.

Filmography

References 

1977 births
Living people
Film directors from Madrid
Spanish film directors
21st-century Spanish screenwriters
Spanish documentary film directors